Jodi Breakers is a 2012 Hindi language Indian romantic comedy film directed by Ashwini Chaudhary. The film features R. Madhavan and Bipasha Basu in the leading roles with Milind Soman, Dipannita Sharma, Omi Vaidya and Mrinalini Sharma in supporting roles. The film had been previously titled as Shaadi Fast Forward but was later changed to Jodi Breakers. Part of the film was shot in Greece. It was released on 24 February 2012 to negative reviews from critics however opened to mixed response at the box office.

Plot 
Siddharth "Sid" Khanna, who is recently divorced meets with his friends in Nano's Bar. He is happy and throws them a bachelor party. But he is sad about the huge alimony payments and more importantly that his ex-wife took the car he loved. A few months later he is a bachelor who works as a divorce managing officer. He meets Sonali Agnihotri, who joins him in his business of splitting couples and they earn well in the process. Together, they are known as the Jodi (Couple) Breakers. Sometimes, they secretly make husband and wife fight with each other, that will result in their divorce.

Once they get an assignment by Mrs Parera who wishes to divorce her husband Marc Parera who is cheating on her. She tells him that he is in Greece with his mistress. Sid and Sonali decide to go to Greece where they secretly take photos of the two. In the process Sonali has grown an affection for Sid which Sid is not wary of. One day Sid tells Sonali that it would be better if they saved their marriage instead of helping in the divorce. Sonali agreed to the plan.

They call Mrs Parera to Greece and it is also revealed that she is also Marc's business partner and is on a business meeting in Greece. Marc decides to do some business while his mistress whose name is Maggie tells him that she will go to a club named Medusa alone. When nobody was in their villa, Sid and Sonali enter the villa, throw a condom in the dustbin and call a masseuse. Sonali dances in the bar under the name Maggie.

When Marc goes to bar Maggie, already bored had left. He heard from the other people that Maggie was amazing. He goes home finds the condom and the masseuse and angrily walks out. The same night Sid and Sonali also get drunk and have sex. Marc goes to Mrs. Parera's place and sleeps there. It is revealed that Mrs Parera is not Marc's wife, her name is Ira and is Sid's ex-wife who told him what to do in return for no alimony payments anymore and that Maggie is Marc's wife.

Sid returns to India and Sonali finds out about Ira and does not work with Sid anymore. Over the next few days Sid realizes he loved her and also finds out that they caused a happy couple to break up and that Maggie is pregnant with Marc's child. Sid talks to Sonali and tells her that he wants to make amends. They reach Madonna's (Marc's grandmother) house and tell her the whole thing. She then gives them her full support.

She calls up Marc and Maggie and puts up a whole plan which included them remaining with her together for some days, going to the church where they got married, a party and getting Marc's blood test done. Ira also discovers the plan and crashes at the party where Sid proposed Sonali (part of the plan). She lied to him about being pregnant. Sid then confesses everything to Marc and he beats him badly. At that time a doctor whom Sid had called tells Marc that he is HIV positive and the blood test of Ira and Maggie needs to be done. Ira initially resisted and angrily blurted out that Marc never slept with her. Actually she mixed sleeping pills for Marc's drink in Greece and led him to believe that they slept.

Madonna angrily slaps her and tells her to get out. Marc and Maggie reconcile. Sid then tells Sonali that he loved her and they share a kiss.

Cast 
 R. Madhavan as Siddharth "Sid" Khanna
 Bipasha Basu as Sonali Agnihotri a.k.a. Bipasha
 Milind Soman as Marc
 Dipannita Sharma as Maggie
 Omi Vaidya as Nainsukhbhai Chamanlal Patel a.k.a. Nano
 Mrinalini Sharma as Ira
 Tarana Raja as Dr. Isha
 Kubra Sait as Vinita
 Mazhar Sayed
 Gurpreet Saini
 Helen as Madonna

Release

Controversy 
Jodi Breakers faced controversy when the Indian distributors of the 2010 French film Heartbreaker alleged that the story of Jodi Breakers was plagiarised from Heartbreaker. The makers of Jodi Breakers offered to let the Heartbreakers team read the entire script, provided they agree to sign a Non Disclosure Agreement (NDA), which the Heartbreakers team was unwilling to sign.

Reception 
The movie received mixed to negative reviews from critics. Taran Adarsh of Bollywood Hungama gave the movie 3 out of 5 stars and concluded his review pointing out, "Jodi Breakers has an engrossing and smartly executed second half that tilts scales in its favor. The right dose of drama and romance, besides a trendy, harmonious musical score, only act as toppings". Kanika Sikka of DNA India gave the movie 2 out of 5 stars, mentioning, "Leave all expectations behind before entering the hall and you 'might' (urgency redefined) walk out with a smiling face." Mansha Rastogi of Nowrunning gave the movie 2 out of 5 stars, noting, "Jodi Breakers fails to make up for a good rom-com. Watch the film only if you are a fan of Maddy and Bips." Savera R Someshwar of Rediff.com gave the movie 1 out of 5 stars, stating, "Jodi Breakers could have been a good romance or a good comedy but it's neither. The film is seriously flawed." Komal Nahta of Koimoi.com also gave the movie 1 in a scale of 5 stars and added, "Jodi Breakers is a dull show. It will not be able to break even.". Faisal Saif of Global Movie magazine gave the film 2 out of 5 stars and stated, "Nothing great [about the movie] to write about except performances".

Soundtrack 

The soundtrack of Jodi Breakers, released by T-Series on 17 January 2012, featured music composed by Salim–Sulaiman with lyrics penned by Irshad Kamil and Shabbir Ahmed.

Reception 
The album received mixed to positive reviews. Joginder Tuteja of Bollywood Hungama gave the music an overall rating of three and half out of five saying "Jodi Breakers has all in it to be one of the more popular albums at the very beginning of the year. Salim-Sulaiman along with Irshad Kamil and Shabbir Ahmed have done their job and now it is up to the makers to make the most out of it and promote it well enough to enhance the music's reach." Rumnique Nannar of Bollyspice concluded "Jodi Breakers is a good album but it is let down by two duds that fail rise above the humdrum lyrics."

References

External links 
 
 
 

2012 films
2012 romantic comedy films
Indian romantic comedy films
Films involved in plagiarism controversies
2010s Hindi-language films
Films shot in Greece